Snowboarding at the 2013 Winter Universiade was held at Monte Bondone from December 11 to December 21, 2013.

Men's events

Women's events

External links
Official results at the universiadetrentino.org.

 
2013 in snowboarding
Snowboarding
Snowboarding in Italy
2013